is the 16th single by Japanese entertainer Miho Nakayama. Written by Yumi Yoshimoto and Anri, the single was released on July 12, 1989, by King Records.

Background and release
"Virgin Eyes" was used as the theme song of the 1989 film Who Do I Choose?, which starred Nakayama in a supporting role.

"Virgin Eyes" peaked at No. 2 on Oricon's weekly singles chart. It sold over 254,000 copies and was certified Gold by the RIAJ.

Nakayama performed the song on the 40th Kōhaku Uta Gassen in 1989.

Track listing

Charts
Weekly charts

Year-end charts

Certification

References

External links

1989 singles
1989 songs
Japanese-language songs
Miho Nakayama songs
King Records (Japan) singles